French North Korean or North Korean French may refer to:
French people in North Korea
North Koreans in France
France–North Korea relations
Multiracial people of French and North Korean descent